Louis Ichard (2 January 1901 – 29 November 1986) was a French long-distance runner. He competed in the marathon at the 1920 Summer Olympics.

References

1901 births
1986 deaths
French male long-distance runners
French male marathon runners
Athletes (track and field) at the 1920 Summer Olympics
Olympic athletes of France
20th-century French people